The Italian Rowing Federation (FIC) is the national governing body for the rowing sport in Italy. The FIS is currently based in Turin. The FIC was founded is 1888.

From 2012 the President of the Federation is the Olympic legend Giuseppe Abbagnale.

See also
Italy national rowing team

References

External links 

Rowing